The 2018 Open Sud de France was a tennis tournament played on indoor hard courts. It was the 31st edition of the Open Sud de France, and part of the ATP World Tour 250 Series of the 2018 ATP World Tour. It took placed at the Arena Montpellier in Montpellier, France, from February 5 to February 11, 2018.

Points and prize money

Point distribution

Prize money

Singles main-draw entrants

Seeds 

 1 Rankings are as of January 29, 2018.

Other entrants 
The following players received wildcards into the singles main draw:
  Julien Benneteau
  Calvin Hemery 
  Lucas Pouille

The following players received entry into the singles main draw using a protected ranking:
  Ričardas Berankis
  John Millman

The following players received entry from the qualifying draw:
  Kenny de Schepper
  Norbert Gombos
  Yannick Maden
  Carlos Taberner

Withdrawals 
Before the tournament
  Tomáš Berdych →replaced by  Dustin Brown
  Steve Darcis →replaced by  Nicolas Mahut
  Peter Gojowczyk →replaced by  Ruben Bemelmans

Retirements 
  Dustin Brown
  Jo-Wilfried Tsonga

ATP doubles main-draw entrants

Seeds 

1 Rankings as of January 29, 2018.

Other entrants 
The following pairs received wildcards into the doubles main draw:
  Benjamin Bonzi /  Hugo Gaston
  Calvin Hemery /  Vincent Millot

Withdrawals 
During the tournament
  Dustin Brown /  Benoît Paire

Finals

Singles 

  Lucas Pouille defeated  Richard Gasquet, 7–6(7–2), 6–4

Doubles 

  Ken Skupski /  Neal Skupski defeated  Ben McLachlan /  Hugo Nys, 7–6(7–2), 6–4

References

External links